Another Case of Brewtality was the fourth full-length album from American hardcore punk band, Gang Green. It was released on October 7, 1997, by Taang Records.

It follows hotly on the heels of an EP, Back & Gacked, which the band produced only five months previous. It contains 23 tracks, of which six were on the EP.

It was the band's first full-length studio album since 1989's Older... Budweiser, and features drummer Walter Gustafson – who had left the band in 1984 and subsequently returned in 1991 to temporarily cover Brian Betzger.

Since Mike Lucantonio and Kevin Brooks had left the band after two new tracks were recorded for the King Of Bands compilation, a new guitarist – Mike Earls – and bassist – Matt Sandonato – were found to play on this album.

It was also the band's first full-length release for Taang Records since 1986's Another Wasted Night. On the same day, Taang also re-released all their early material – from 1981 to 1983 – on a CD called Preschool.

Overview
The lyrics on Another Case of Brewtality revert from the socio-political stance on Older... Budweiser to the band's earlier subject matter of drinking, partying, and womanizing. The songs are generally short and fast-paced with one track falling headlong into another, and changes in tempo are frequent. A cover version of a Stiff Little Fingers song, "Suspect Device", is present.

Track listing

Personnel
 Chris Doherty – vocals, guitar
 Mike Earls – guitar
 Matt Sandonato – bass
 Walter Gustafson – drums
 Dave Minehan – additional guitar on tracks 9, 12, and 13
 Dave Connolly – lead vocals on "6,000 Crucified Slaves"
 Recorded December, 1996 at Capertown Sound, Boston, Massachusetts, U.S.
 Produced and engineered by Dave Minehan, Walter Gustafson, and Chris Doherty
 Mixed by Dave Minehan and Walter Gustafson

References

External links
Taang Records band page
Trouserpress entry for Gang Green
More info on Gang Green

1997 albums
Gang Green albums